A number of armouries and drill halls exist in communities across Canada. Of these, the majority were built in Ontario and Quebec.

Architecture

Chief Dominion Architects
The Chief Dominion Architect(s) designed a number of prominent public buildings in Canada including armouries, drill halls, post offices, and Dominion Public Buildings : Thomas Seaton Scott (1871–1881); Thomas Fuller (1881–1897); David Ewart (1897–1914); Edgar Lewis Horwood (1914–1918); Richard Cotsman Wright (1918–1927); Thomas W. Fuller (1927–1936), Charles D. Sutherland (1936–1947); Joseph Charles Gustave Brault (1947–1952)

Thomas Seaton Scott, Thomas Fuller and Thomas W. Fuller adopted the Dominion Style Neo-Gothic style. David Ewart embraced the Baronial style. The armouries may display Gothic Revival (1740s+), Tudorbethan (1835–1885+), Romanesque Revival (1840–1930); Colonial Revival (1890s+); Châteauesque (1887–1930) or Edwardian Baroque 1901-1922 style.

Drawings for virtually all armoury and drill hall buildings designed by The Chief Dominion Architect and his staff during his tenure as Chief Architect of the Department of Public Works are now held at the National Archives of Canada, Ottawa, Ontario.

In some cases, architects obtained the commission to design these buildings in collaboration with the staff architects in the federal Department of the Militia in Ottawa.

Staff architects in the Federal Department of the Militia

Militia and defense buildings in Canada which were not designed by the Dept. of Public Works were the responsibility of staff architects in the Federal Department of the Militia. Staff architects inspected and oversaw the design, construction and maintenance of Militia buildings, and designed the Munitions Stores buildings which were often erected adjacent to Drill Hall buildings to storage weapons, uniforms, and ammunition. From 1886 to 1893, Henry James served as Chief Architect for the federal Militia Department. Lieutenant Frederick W. White succeeded as Chief Architect for the federal Militia Department 1893–1897. Lieutenant Paul Weatherbe succeeded as Chief Architect and Engineer from 1897 to 1905.

History
During the 1860s, the American Civil War and the Fenian Raids raised fears for the defence of British North America. In response, the Canadian militia was strengthened, and many rural communities erected a drill hall to train their volunteers.

During the early stages of construction, in the 1870s to 1890s, rural militia units, rather than the Department of Defence, were responsible for their construction. Armouries are centrally and prominently located in the historic city or town centers, and are well-known community landmarks.

Eleven drill halls were built in Ontario between 1876 and 1918 to improve the Canadian military as part of a campaign to reform and expand the Active Volunteer Militia. This period of reform turned the Canadian militia from a poorly equipped citizens' militia into an organized, competent fighting unit that was well prepared for the First World War. Designed with classical inspiration, the brick buildings are box-like with a flat roof, stonework on the base, crenellation, and Parapet walls.

From 1896 to 1918 over 100 drill halls and armouries were erected across Canada.

The armouries functioned as training and recruitment centres during First World War, and later for the Second World War and the Korean War. The space generally doubles as an assembly / Lecture hall. Traditionally, armouries serve as the permanent regimental headquarters of the local militia and as a drill hall for Militia practice and training.

The standard North American armoury model incorporates medieval military features such as jutting towers, buttresses, dentilated stringcourses, corbelling, crenellations, battlements and a large troop door reminiscent of a fortified gate. The distinguishing characteristics include functional design, good quality materials, excellent craftsmanship and unobstructed volume of floor space in the drill hall enabled by a gable roof.  The foundation is frequently stone with a concrete floor supporting a steel frame. The exterior walls are frequently constructed with red brick and quarry-faced stone generally limestone or sandstone with a course of arched wood sash windows and doors. An armoury generally enclose a large drill hall, messes, classrooms and storage facilities.

A number of ‘Standard Drill Hall Class E’ armouries were built in a straightforward utilitarian design with modest architectural embellishment in an Edwardian Baroque 1901-1922 style. The design incorporates a large, unobstructed drill hall with exposed steel trusses, its gallery and supporting arcades. The decorative Flemish style parapets, towers, crenellated turrets and a low wide arched entrance, reminiscent of a fortified gate show very good craftsmanship. Edwardian Baroque 1901-1922 armouries incorporate distinguishing features such as red brick with a stone foundation, stone sills, window surrounds and decorative shields which contribute to a powerful image of stability and stateliness. To evoke the impression of a medieval castle, the walls incorporate buttresses, parapets, crenellated moulding, corbelled stonework and crenellated towers flanking its troop door. The distinguishing characteristics include double or triple Tudor gothic arches and projecting surround at the front entrance, defence towers, and wall treatments which step out at the corners. To convey an image of solidity and impregnability, the building have small narrow windows, Bartizans, and small Turrets complete with firing slits.

Armouries constructed in 1920s and 1930s reflect the popularity of Colonial Revival (1890s+) styles derived from simplified French colonial architecture of the Baroque era.

During the 1930s, a number of inter-war armouries were built employing modern structural design with concrete floors supporting a steel frame gable roofed drill hall, the Hipped roof, prominent chimneys and exposed Warren trusses for its large, unobstructed space. The details of its entrance and exhibits the stylized and simplified Châteauesque (1887–1930) style details, which reflect contemporary interests in smooth surfaces and geometric volumes. The distinguishing characteristics include red brick and white limestone round towers, elaborate arched entrances, wood panelled entrance doors, heavy iron hardware and multi-paned glazing which reflect the revivalist design. The decorative elements including Stringcourses, Copings, window trims, concentric Tudor entrance arches, and carved plaques.

The armouries may be National Historic Sites of Canada, and/or classified or recognized as Federal Heritage Buildings because of their historical associations, architectural and environmental values.

During the 1950s, the Department of National Defence used a standard plan for a drill hall on several military bases, designed by the architect firm of Gordon S. Adamson & Associates featuring a simple and unadorned composition, and a standard layout.

Alphabetical listing (by community)

References

}

External links
Federal Heritage Buildings
Canada's Register of Historic Places
Thomas Seaton Scott, Chief Dominion Architect 1872-1881
Thomas Fuller (architect), Chief Dominion Architect 1881-1896
David Ewart, Chief Dominion Architect 1896-1914
Richard Cotsman Wright, Chief Dominion Architect 1918-1927]
Thomas W. Fuller, Chief Dominion Architect 1927-1936
Hubert Carroll McBride
Charles Arthur Julian Sharman
Donald Norman MacVicar
Ferdinand Herbert Marani 

Armouries in Canada
Armouries
Regimental museums in Canada
Military and war museums in Canada
Canadian federal government buildings